Petroglyph is the second album by Tim Reynolds to be offered as a free internet download. It was originally made available to the public on Reynolds' official website on 25 May 2002.

Track listing
 "Bonehenge" – 2:57
 "Run Into Your Life" – 6:30
 "Big Foot" – 4:22
 "Ferry Across The River Styx" – 4:37
 "Grab My Shades" – 5:28
 "Creature On Quaaludes" – 2:27
 "Fractional Fields" – 7:23
 "Chaos View Drip" – 3:23
 "Step On This Thing" – 4:40
 "Time Chamber" – 2:47
 "Backflip " – 3:33
 "Arcturus Landing" – 7:20
 "Sorry I Burned It" – 3:09
 "Vulcan Hammer Head" – 4:48

External links
Tim Reynolds official website

2002 albums
Tim Reynolds albums